Goshpur Ezra is a Gram panchayat in Hajipur, Vaishali district, Bihar. The nearest city is Hajipur, 6 km away.

Geography
This panchayat is located at

Nearest major road highway or river
SH 74 (State highway 74) 
And gandak river

Villages
There are 7 villages: Chaksama Urf Kazichak, Asdharpur (Astipur), Chakaraviya aka Raviya Chak, Paharpur, Gauspur Izra, Latmara and Izra Shah Mian alias Maulnachak.

References

Gram panchayats in Bihar
Villages in Vaishali district
Vaishali district
Hajipur